MassKara Festival Queen is a local beauty pageant in Bacolod, Negros Occidental, Philippines. Begun in 1981, it is one of the highlights of a week-long celebration called the MassKara Festival.

List of titleholders

Lin-ay sang Negros
 Meg Urmeneta was 2002 Masskara Festival Queen but represented Sagay in Lin-ay sang Negros 2004. Eventually she was dethroned and was replaced by Hinoba-an's  Blance Marie Brown.
 Jan Nicole Puentevella (2003) represented Bacolod City in Lin-ay sang Negros 2006 and won the title.
 Kristine Alonso, Masskara Festival Queen 2007 1st runner up represented Bacolod City in Lin-ay sang Negros 2008 and was placed 2nd runner up and awarded as Miss Convergys, Miss PNOC-EDC, Miss Boardwalk, Miss Cali, Miss Magnolia, and Miss Super Ferry.
 Alexis Danica Drilon (2011) represented Bacolod City in Lin-ay sang Negros 2014 and won the title.

Stint on National Pageants
 Jewel Mae Lobaton (1993) joined Binibining Pilipinas 1995 and made it to the Top 15. Three years after, she joined Binibining Pilipinas 1998 and was adjudged First Runner-Up. When the winner Tisha Silang was dethroned because of citizenship issue, she took over as the Binibining Pilipinas-Universe 1998 and went on to represent Philippines to the Miss Universe 1998 pageant in Honolulu, Hawaii, United States.
 Carmela Arcolas (1995) joined the Miss Philippine Centennial pageant in Clark Pampanga in 1998 and emerged the winner.
 Jona Jarder (1997) made it to the Top 10 of Binibining Pilipinas 2000
 Althea Mauricio joined Binibining Pilipinas 2003 and was adjudged 3rd Place-Best in Talent.
 Kristine Alonso, Masskara Festival Queen 2007 1st runner-up joined Miss Philippines- Earth 2010 representing Bacolod City where she was placed Top 10 of Best in Talent. By 2016 and 2017 consecutively, she was assigned as Team Manager for Miss Earth international pageant.

References

Tourist attractions in Bacolod
Beauty pageants in the Philippines
Culture of Negros Occidental
Recurring events established in 1981